Corynactis is a genus of colonial anthozoans similar in appearance to sea anemones and in body format to scleractinian stony corals. These animals are cnidarians in the family Corallimorphidae. Large unidentified polyps of this genus feed on the crown-of-thorns seastar Acanthaster planci and may help control the crown-of-thorns population.

Species
Species so far described in this genus include:
Corynactis annulata Verrill, 1867
Corynactis australis Haddon & Duerden, 1896
Corynactis caboverdensis den Hartog, Ocaña & Brito, 1993
Corynactis californica Carlgren, 1936
Corynactis caribbeorum den Hartog, 1980
Corynactis carnea Studer, 1879
Corynactis chilensis Carlgren, 1941
Corynactis delawarei Widersten, 1976
Corynactis denhartogi Ocaña, 2003
Corynactis denticulosa Le Sueur, 1817
Corynactis globulifera Hemprich & Ehrenberg in Ehrenberg, 1834
Corynactis parvula Duchassaing & Michelotti, 1860
Corynactis sanmatiensis (Zamponi, 1976)
Corynactis viridis Allman, 1846

Feeding
Corynactis, like other corals in the phylum Corallimorpharia, depend highly on their production of zooxanthellae and numerous animals which find themselves trapped by the oral disk as benthic invertebrates, crustaceans, worms, echinoderms and even fishes. They are very aggressive eaters, which allows for them to feed on larger particles in the water column.

References

Corallimorphidae
Hexacorallia genera